NZZ Geschichte is a German language bimonthly history magazine which has been in circulation since 2015 in Switzerland. The magazine is the first Swiss magazine in its category.

History and profile
NZZ Geschichte was first published on 16 April 2015 as a quarterly magazine. The magazine is part of the NZZ Mediengruppe and based in Zurich. It publishes articles on Swiss and international history written by historians. The frequency of the magazine was switched to bimonthly later.

References

External links
 

2015 establishments in Switzerland
Bi-monthly magazines published in Switzerland
German-language magazines
History magazines
Magazines established in 2015
Magazines published in Zürich
Quarterly magazines published in Switzerland